CMLL Super Viernes is professional wrestling promotion Consejo Mundial de Lucha Libre's (CMLL) Friday night wrestling show that takes place in Arena México every week unless a Pay-Per-View or a major wrestling event is scheduled to take place on that night instead. CMLL began holding their weekly Friday night "Super Viernes" shows as far back as 1938, with 2012 being no exception. Some of the matches from Super Viernes are taped for CMLL's weekly shows that air in Mexico the week following the Super Viernes show. The Super Viernes show was replaced by four major CMLL events in 20102, Homenaje a Dos Leyendas, Infierno en en Ring, the CMLL 79th Anniversary Show and Sin Piedad. The July 27, 2012 Super Viernes was one of only few Friday night shows to ever be cancelled, on this occasion due to a demonstration in the streets of Mexico City near Arena México.

The 2012 Super Viernes shows has hosted 7 championship matches in total, with 5 championship changes occurring. The following championships changed hands during 2012 on Super Viernes: CMLL World Women's Championship (March 9), NWA World Historic Middleweight Championship (March 30), Mexican National Trios Championship (June 22), CMLL World Tag Team Championship (August 3) and the NWA World Historic Middleweight Championship (September 28). Both the CMLL World Trios Championship (April 27) and the CMLL World Middleweight Championship (July 20) were successfully defended by the champions. Only one Lucha de Apuestas match was held on a Super Viernes, which featured Rey Escorpión defeating Black Warrior for the right to shave Warrior's hair off. The show traditionally hosts all the major tournaments, for 2012 that included the 2012 version of CMLL Reyes del Aire, Torneo Nacional de Parejas Increibles, Torneo Gran Alternativa, En Busca de un Ídolo, Campeon Universal Del CMLL tournaments. It also featured a one-night Cuadrangular de Tercias tournament.

The shows featured 256 matches, 221 matches in the male division, 24 featuring the female division and 11 featuring the Mini-Estrellas. 131 different wrestlers appeared in matches during CMLL's Super Viernes shows. Of those 131 wrestlers 18 were Mini-Estrellas and 19 were women. Atlantis wrestled 37 matches in total, the most of any individual wrestler. Marcela was the woman most often featured on Super Viernes with 15 matches, appearing in 62.5% of the women's matches booked for Super Viernes. Astral was the Mini-Estrella who had the most appearances, wrestling 7 times in total, or in 63.6% of all Mini-Estrella matches. Enrique Vera Jr., Morphosis, Loco Max, Ramstein, Taurus, Hikaru, Tsukasa, Lady Afrodita, Ayumi, Bam Bam, Shockercito and Pequeño Universo 2000 only worked on one Super Viernes during 2012 so far.

Super Viernes shows of 2012

Notes

References

2012 in professional wrestling
Professional wrestling-related lists
2012